Wernersville State Hospital, founded in 1891 as the State Asylum for the Chronic Insane, is one of six state hospitals in the Commonwealth of Pennsylvania. The hospital is operated by the Pennsylvania Department of Human Services' Office of Mental Health and Substance Abuse Services (OMHSAS).

Location 
Wernersville State Hospital is located in the Appalachian hills of rural Berks County about 15 miles from Reading in South Heidelberg.

References

1891 establishments in Pennsylvania
Buildings and structures in Berks County, Pennsylvania
Psychiatric hospitals in Pennsylvania